Taihe station, is a station of Line 14 of the Guangzhou Metro. It started operations on 28 December 2018.

The station has an underground island platform. Platform 1 is for trains heading to Dongfeng, whilst platform 2 is for trains heading to Jiahewanggang, along with 2 unused bypass tracks next to the stopping tracks.

Exits
There are 4 exits, lettered A, C, D and E. Exit E is accessible. All exits are located on Guangcong No. 3 Road.

Gallery

References

 Railway stations in China opened in 2018
 Guangzhou Metro stations in Baiyun District